Giorgi Davitnidze (born 18 July 1978) is a Georgian former professional football player.

1978 births
Living people
Footballers from Georgia (country)
Expatriate footballers from Georgia (country)
Expatriate footballers in Ukraine
Expatriate sportspeople from Georgia (country) in Ukraine
Expatriate footballers in Russia
Expatriate footballers in Israel
Russian Premier League players
FC Dinamo Tbilisi players
FC Elista players
FC Nyva Ternopil players
Ukrainian Premier League players
Georgia (country) international footballers
People from Rustavi
Association football defenders